Stanisława Wysocka (1877–1941) was a Polish actress and theatre director. Teacher of Państwowy Instytut Sztuki Teatralnej.

Filmography
 Mocny człowiek (1929)
 Ponad śnieg (1929)
 Jaśnie pan szofer (1935)
 Trędowata (1936)
 Dziewczęta z Nowolipek (1937)
 Second Youth (1938)
 Dziewczyna szuka miłości (1938)
 Granica (1938)
 Gehenna (1938)
 Wrzos (1938)
 Kobiety nad przepaścią (1938)
 Ludzie Wisły (1938)
 The Vagabonds (1939)
 Czarne diamenty (1939)
 O czym sie nie mówi... (1939)
 Nad Niemnem (1939)

Bibliography
 Skaff, Sheila. The Law of the Looking Glass: Cinema in Poland, 1896-1939. Ohio University Press, 2008.

External links

Stanisława Wysocka at e-teatr.pl

1877 births
1941 deaths
Polish film actresses
Polish silent film actresses
Actresses from Warsaw
Polish stage actresses
Polish theatre directors
Golden Laurel of the Polish Academy of Literature
20th-century Polish actresses
19th-century Polish actresses